DuRandt Gerber (born 28 February 1982) is a South African-born Italian rugby union player. He can play as a fly-half, winger or full-back.

Career

Youth
He started his career playing for his school side. Formerly a full-back, he played for Outeniqua High School second team. He moved to the fly-half position and was included in the  team in 2001. In 2005, he moved to Pietersburg and played for the  amateur and country districts teams.

Italian club rugby
Gerber moved to Italy in 2006, joining Frascati for the 2006–2007 season and Algero in 2007–08. The following season, he signed a deal with Gran Parma, where he spent the next three seasons. He won the "Player-of-the-Season" award and was the top try scorer for Parma in the 2009–2010 Super 10 season. The team played as Gran Ducato Parma in the new National Championship of Excellence in 2010–2011 and he was once again the top try scorer with six tries.

He played for L'Aquila in the 2011–2012 season and for Lazio for 2012–13.

Return to South Africa
In 2013, he returned to South Africa and joined  for the 2013 Currie Cup Premier Division season.

Return to Italy
After making just six appearances for Griquas, however, he returned to Italy to join former side Lazio.

Italy A
He represented Italy 'A' in the 2011 Churchill Cup. He was also included in the training camp for the national team for the 2011 Rugby World Cup, but missed out on the final group.

References

South African rugby union players
Living people
1982 births
People from George, South Africa
Griquas (rugby union) players
Rugby union fly-halves
Rugby union players from the Western Cape